The Izvor is a left tributary of the river Neajlov in Romania. It flows into the Neajlov near Ragu.

References

Rivers of Romania
Rivers of Dâmbovița County